The R-26 was a second-generation intercontinental ballistic missile (ICBM) designed but not deployed by the Soviet Union during the Cold War. Its control system was designed at NPO "Electropribor" (Kharkov, Ukrainian SSR). The missile was mistakenly identified as an R-9 Desna and given the NATO reporting name SS-8 Sasin.  Within the Soviet Union, it carried the GRAU index 8K66.

Development 

Design of the R-26 was initiated to develop a light liquid propellant powered ICBM.  Designs received approval in 1960, but prior to flight tests were cancelled by the government in 1962.

The missile was revealed during a Red Square parade in November 1964, where it was misidentified as an R-9 Desna.  However, the program had already been cancelled and the error was not rectified.

Operators 

   The Strategic Rocket Forces were to be the only operator of the R-26, but it was cancelled before entry into service.

See also 

 List of missiles

External links 
Astronautix

References 

Cold War intercontinental ballistic missiles of the Soviet Union
R-026